Daniel Paul Coulombe  (born October 26, 1989) is an American professional baseball pitcher in the Minnesota Twins organization. He previously played in MLB for the Los Angeles Dodgers, Oakland Athletics and Minnesota Twins.

Amateur career

Coulombe attended Chaparral High School in Scottsdale, Arizona. As  a senior he was 9–0 with a 0.75 earned run average (ERA) and 138 strikeouts. He was named to the Rawlings All-America team, and was a Baseball America Third-team All-American and State Player of the Year. He set several school records including career strikeouts (288), single season strikeouts (138) and single game strikeouts (20). He was part of two state championship teams and the 2006 Connie Mack World Series champions.

The Los Angeles Dodgers selected Coulombe in the 17th round of the 2008 Major League Baseball Draft, but he did not sign. He chose to attend the University of Southern California (USC) on an athletic scholarship to play college baseball for the USC Trojans. Coach Chad Kreuter said he expected Coulombe to be a "premier pitcher at USC." However, he only appeared in four games as a freshman (making one start) and was 0–1 with a 13.50 ERA. Coulombe claimed that he was not healthy that season and it was affecting his mechanics.

Coulombe left USC and enrolled at South Mountain Community College. In the first inning of his first start he felt a pop in the back of his shoulder and left the game. Unable to regain his mechanics after the injury, the coaches shut him down for the rest of the season. He briefly considered giving up baseball but chose to enroll at Texas Tech University for his junior season.  He was the Red Raiders opening day starter in 2011 and combined with two relievers on a two-hitter. He suffered a torn ulnar collateral ligament in his pitching elbow on March 11, costing him the rest of the season. Coulombe underwent Tommy John surgery and returned to action the following season, allowing three hits and one run in 5  innings in his return. He appeared in 10 games (only two starts) and was 1–0 with a 2.53 ERA.

Professional career

Los Angeles Dodgers
Coulombe was then drafted again by the Dodgers, in the 25th round of the 2012 MLB Draft, and signed on June 15, 2012. He played with the Ogden Raptors and Great Lakes Loons in 2012 and spent all of 2013 with the Rancho Cucamonga Quakes of the California League, where he was 4–2 with a 4.05 earned run average (ERA) in 54 appearances. In 2014, he began the season with the Quakes, where he was 3–0 with a 3.05 ERA in 31 games before a late season promotion to the AA Chattanooga Lookouts, where he was in 18 games with a 2.57 ERA.

The Dodgers purchased his contract and called him up to the Majors on September 16, 2014. He pitched one scoreless inning of relief against the Colorado Rockies that same day. He was in five games for the Dodgers in September, allowing two earned runs in 4.1 innings, while being used as a lefty specialist.

Coulombe was assigned to the AAA Oklahoma City Dodgers to start the 2015 season. He spent the bulk of the season in AAA, appearing in 38 games with a 3.27 ERA. He did play in five games in Los Angeles, allowing seven runs in 8  innings. On September 6, he was designated for assignment and removed from the 40 man roster.

Oakland Athletics
On September 10, 2015, Coulombe was traded to the Oakland Athletics in exchange for cash considerations. He allowed three runs in seven and two thirds innings in nine games and was designated for assignment after the season. He began the 2016 season with the AAA Nashville Sounds. On May 10, his contract was purchased by the A's. He declared free agency on October 2, 2018.

New York Yankees
On December 18, 2018, Coulombe signed a minor league contract with the New York Yankees. He received a non-roster invitation to spring training. He was released on July 1, 2019.

Milwaukee Brewers
On July 19, 2019, Coulombe signed a minor league deal with the Milwaukee Brewers. He was released on August 29, 2019.

Second stint with New York Yankees
On August 31, 2019, Coulombe signed a minor league deal with the New York Yankees. He became a free agent following the 2019 season.

Minnesota Twins
On January 26, 2020, Coulombe signed a minor league deal with the Minnesota Twins. On August 22, 2020, Coulombe was selected to the major leagues.  That day, Coulombe threw two shutout innings of relief in his first major league appearance since 2018. Coulombe was designated for assignment on August 28. He elected free agency on October 13, 2020. On November 17, 2020, Coulombe resigned with the Twins on a minor league contract.
On June 25, 2021, Coulombe was selected to the active roster.

On November 30, Coulombe was non-tendered by the Twins, making him a free agent.
On December 2, Coulombe re-signed with the Twins. On April 4, 2022, Coulombe had his contract selected by the Twins. He re-signed a minor league deal on December 30, 2022.

Personal
Coulombe's grandfather, Bertrand Oscar Coulombe, served in the United States Air Force during World War II. He was the flight engineer and top turret gunner for a B-17 Flying Fortress named Ye Olde Pub when it was nearly shot down on December 20, 1943.  Bertrand Coulombe posthumously received the Silver Star for the events of that incident which have been recorded in a New York Times and International Best Seller book entitled, A Higher Call by Adam Makos.  The rights to this book have been purchased for an upcoming movie.

References

External links

1989 births
Living people
Baseball players from Scottsdale, Arizona
Major League Baseball pitchers
Los Angeles Dodgers players
Oakland Athletics players
Minnesota Twins players
USC Trojans baseball players
Texas Tech Red Raiders baseball players
Ogden Raptors players
Great Lakes Loons players
Rancho Cucamonga Quakes players
Indios de Mayagüez players
Chattanooga Lookouts players
Oklahoma City Dodgers players
Nashville Sounds players
San Antonio Missions players
Scranton/Wilkes-Barre RailRiders players
South Mountain Cougars baseball players